The Houw Hoek Hotel, previously called the Houw Hoek Inn, is a hotel on the N2 national road between Grabouw and Botrivier in South Africa, close to the summit of the Houwhoek Pass, on the Overberg branch line. It is one of the oldest licensed hotels in the country, with a ground floor dating from 1779.

External links
Houw Hoek Hotel

References

Buildings and structures in the Western Cape
Tourism in the Western Cape
Hotels in South Africa
Hotels established in 1779
1779 establishments in Africa